Hyperolius puncticulatus is a species of frog in the family Hyperoliidae. It is endemic to Unguja (=Zanzibar), Tanzania. Its natural habitats are dry forest, moist forest, and bush land. It breeds in pools, and males can be heard calling from the surrounding vegetation. Although quite common species within its small range, it is considered endangered by the IUCN because of habitat loss.

References

puncticulatus
Frogs of Africa
Amphibians of Tanzania
Endemic fauna of Tanzania
Amphibians described in 1893
Taxa named by Georg Johann Pfeffer
Taxonomy articles created by Polbot